Kim Dae-woong, better known as Black Nut (Hangul: 블랙넛), is a South Korean rapper from Jeonju, North Jeolla Province, signed to hip hop record label Just Music. He reportedly acted as the record label's interim president starting in 2014, while founder Swings was enlisted in the military. Black Nut rose to fame following his controversial performances on the 2015 TV series, Show Me the Money 4.

Show Me the Money 4 
Black Nut participated in Show Me the Money 4 where many notable rappers participated. He dissed Mino who was an Idol who participated in Show Me the Money 4. He was the third place of the competition, defeated by Mino.

Sexual harassment case 
In June 2017, female rapper KittiB filed a complaint with the Seoul District Prosecutor's Office against Black Nut for sexual harassment, including making sexually explicit comments about her during his concerts and harassing her via social media. In January 2019, the Seoul Central District Court indicted Black Nut on these charges and sentenced him to six months in prison, two years probation, and 160 hours of community service.

Discography

Mix tapes

Singles

Awards

Hiphopplaya Awards

References 

1989 births
Living people
South Korean male rappers
South Korean hip hop record producers
Show Me the Money (South Korean TV series) contestants
People from Jeonju